Śródmieście-Północ is a municipal neighbourhood of the city of Szczecin, Poland, in Śródmieście (Centre) District. As of January 2011 it had a population of 12,507.

References 

Neighbourhoods of Szczecin